Heart of America Council serves Scouts in Missouri and Kansas.  This council was formed on July 1, 1974, with the merger of the former Kansas City Area (Kansas City, Missouri) and Kaw (Kansas City, Kansas) Councils.

History
The Heart of America Council has grown from a fledgling organization in 1910 to a council serving over 30,000 youth in 2015.  There are 14,813 trained leaders volunteering their time and talent to serve the youth in the nineteen counties making up the council.  In 2015 Scouts provided over 196,000 hours of service to residents and organizations in the council.  There were 16,905 rank advancements and 32,279 merit badges earned during that calendar year.  Over 18,000 Scouts camped at one of the camps run by the Heart of America Council during 2015.

Camps

H. Roe Bartle Scout Reservation
It is one of two Scout reservations operated by the Heart of America Council. It is also 2½ miles away from Iconium, Missouri.

It was named after former Kansas City, Missouri, mayor and Boy Scout council executive H. Roe Bartle.  The reservation is divided into three camps named Lone Star (previously Wigwam), Sawmill, and Piercing Arrow (previously Frontier).  Bartle is one of two Boy Scout camps to participate in the leadership program named Mic-O-Say.

Theodore Naish Scout Reservation

Theodore Naish Scout Reservation is an 850-acre Boy Scout camp located in Bonner Springs, Kansas.  The camp was named after Kansas City civil engineer and draftsman Theodore Naish, who was killed in the sinking of the RMS Lusitania in 1915.  The first  of the land were donated to the Boy Scouts in 1926 by Naish's wife, Belle Saunders Naish.  Camp Naish is run by the Heart of America Council and is one of two camps sponsored by the council.  Naish is home to the Tamegonit Lodge of the Order of the Arrow

Order of the Arrow

Tamegonit Lodge is a Lodge of the Order of the Arrow located at Theodore Naish Scout Reservation in Bonner Springs, Kansas.

At the 2006 NOAC, the Ceremonial Team was chosen to represent the plains tribes with their Cheyenne set of regalia in a living museum. There were only 5 areas of the Plains Indians to represent. The Ceremonial Team also has been recognized as one of the best in the country. They have won many awards at Section Conclave, including the most recent Section C-5B Conclave for 2018, and even were the National champions in 1983 – one of the last years champions were named. 

Seven members of the Lodge have also been recognized with the Distinguished Service Award, a National Award to individual Arrowman based on their ongoing service to Scouting and the Order.  The most recent recipient of the Distinguished Service Award was at the National Order of the Arrow Conference in 2012.  Tamegonit Lodge has also been honored with the E. Urner Goodman Camping Award and the Quality Lodge award (as recent as 2011). 

Tamegonit Lodge has most recently received a JTE Lodge level of Bronze for 2018, and Silver for 2016.

Tamegonit Lodge also made history by becoming one of the first Lodge's to induct female Venturers into the Order of the Arrow. The Winter Induction, which was nicknamed #Winter1 to gain popularity, was hosted at Camp Naish in Bonner Springs, Kansas. The Induction weekend was held on February 1–3, 2019 and a Klondike event was held on February 2. The last Ordeal candidate was sashed at exactly 8:00 pm CST on Saturday, February 2nd. 

Tamegonit Lodge ended 2015 as the largest Lodge in the Nation with 4,541 dues paying members.

See also

Scouting in Missouri

References

External links
http://www.hoac-bsa.org

Local councils of the Boy Scouts of America
Central Region (Boy Scouts of America)
Youth organizations based in Missouri
1974 establishments in Missouri